Emma Soames (born 9 September 1949) is a British editor. She is the granddaughter of Winston Churchill via her mother, Mary, Baroness Soames, and the one-time girlfriend of Martin Amis. Her brother is Nicholas Soames, Baron Soames of Fletching who was a Conservative minister of defence under Sir John Major.

Education
Soames was educated at three independent schools: at Laverock School in Oxted in Surrey, followed by Hamilton House School in Kent (both in South East England), followed by Queen's College (from 1965–66) in Harley Street in Central London. She then studied in Paris at the Sorbonne and at Sciences Po.

Life and career
Editor of Literary Review, Tatler, and ES Magazine, Soames was a long-serving editor of the Telegraph magazine, then editor of Saga Magazine.

In 2016 she appeared on a BBC Four show on the subject of Winston Churchill and his paintings.

External links
 Interview with Lynn Barber, The Observer, 1 December 2002 
 Entry in The Peerage
 The day a nation buried WW2 leader Winston Churchill: BBC video of Emma Soames' recollections, 30 January 2014

1949 births
Living people
People educated at Queen's College, London
British journalists
Emma
Daughters of life peers